A total of 1,656 candidates contested the 2018 Slovenian parliamentary election, five of them for the positions of representatives of national minorities.

Nationwide 
List of candidates for 2018 Slovene parliamentary elections:

Andrej Čuš and the Greens of Slovenia (AČZS)

Democratic Party of Pensioners of Slovenia (DeSUS)

Economic Active Party (GAS)

For a Healthy Society (ZZD)

Forward Slovenia (NPS)

Good Country (DD)

List of Journalist Bojan Požar (LNBP)

List of Marjan Šarec (LMŠ)

Modern Centre Party (SMC)

New Slovenia - Christian Democrats (NSi)

Party of Alenka Bratušek (SAB)

Party of Slovene People (SSN)

Pirate Party of Slovenia (Pirati)

Save Slovenia from Elite and Tycoons

Slovene Democratic Party (SDS)

Slovene National Party (SNS)

Slovene People's Party (SLS)

Social Democrats (SD)

Socialist Party of Slovenia (SPS)

Solidarity - For a Fair Society! (Solidarnost)

Together Forward (SN)

The left (Levica)

United left and Unity (ZL-S)

United Right (ZD)

United Slovenia (ZSi)

Representatives of national minorities

Italian national minority

Hungarian national minority

List of current MPs that are not running 

 Marija Bačič (SD)
 Dejan Balažič (SMC)
 Roberto Battelli (Italian minority) - longest serving MP in history of Slovenia
 Mirjam Bon Klanjšček (SAB)
 Marko Ferluga (SMC)
 Tomaž Gantar (DeSUS)
 László Göncz (Hungarian minority)
 Irena Grošelj Košnik (SMC)
 Matjaž Hanžek (Independent)
 Irena Kotnik (SMC)
 Marjana Kotnik Poropat (DeSUS)
 Marija Antonija Kovačič (DeSUS)
 Bojan Krajnc (Independent)
 Simona Kustec Lipicer (SMC) - leader of SMC in the National Assembly
 Franc Laj (Independent)
 Marinka Levičar (DeSUS)
 Teja Ljubič (SMC)
 Vlasta Počkaj (SMC)
 Ivan Prelog (SMC)
 Vesna Vervega (SMC)
 Branko Zorman (SMC)

References 

Slovenia
2018
Parliamentary election